Uttarayan is a Marathi directorial debut film of Bipin Nadkarni starring Shivaji Satam and Neena Kulkarni in lead roles. It has won the National Film Award for Best Feature Film in Marathi. The plot of the film is based on the Marathi play "Durgi" written by Jaywant Dalvi.

Plot
Raghuvir Rajadhyaksha (Raghu) moves to Mumbai after his retirement to live with his son Sanjay, who is now getting married and has future plans of going to USA. Raghu, a widower for the past 14 years meets Kusumawati, his teenage crush. Kusumawati is now known as Durgi, as she was named that after her marriage with a rich barrister from Pune. Durgi's marriage fails as she is abused & harassed. Her father dies of a heart attack and her brother sells off all the property and leaves with his wife to live separately. Durgi is thus left alone to aid her ailing old mother. Raghu, being all alone and finding Durgi also to be same, falls in love with her again and decides to get married. But he has to face opposition from his son and his wife's sister.

Cast
 Shivaji Satham as  Raghuvir Rajadhyaksha / Raghu
 Neena Kulkarni as Kusumawati / Durgi
 Uttara Baokar as Mai (Kusumawati's mother)
 Viju Khote as Babu Borkar
 Akshay Pendse as Sanjay (Raghu's son)
 Sharad Kelkar as Young Raghu
 Gauri Nigudkar as Young Kusumawati
 Suhita Thatte as (Raghu's wife's sister)
 Priya Khopkar as Sanjay's wife

Music
The songs of the film are written by Kaustubh Savarkar and the music is composed by Amartya Bobo Rahut.

Awards

National Film Awards
 Won: National Film Award for Best Feature Film in Marathi

Alpha Gaurav Awards
 The film won 12 nominations and received 7 awards.

References

External links 

Best Marathi Feature Film National Film Award winners
2000s Marathi-language films